Dorian Williams (born June 8, 2001) is an American football linebacker. He played college football at Tulane.

Career
Williams attended Indian Land High School in Indian Land, South Carolina. He committed to Tulane University to play college football.

Williams played at Tulane from 2019 to 2022. As a senior, he had 132 tackles, five sacks and two interceptions. For his career, he had 316 tackles, 9.5 sacks and two interceptions. He was named the MVP of the 2023 Cotton Bowl Classic after recording 17 tackles.

References

External links
Tulane Green Wave bio

Living people

2001 births
Players of American football from South Carolina
American football linebackers
Tulane Green Wave football players